Collinson Ridge is a bare rock spur next north of Halfmoon Bluff in the northwest part of the Cumulus Hills, Queen Maud Mountains. It was mapped by the United States Geological Survey from surveys and from U.S. Navy aerial photographs, 1960–64, and named by the Advisory Committee on Antarctic Names for Professor James W. Collinson of Ohio State University, a member of the Institute of Polar Studies geological expedition who worked at this spur in 1970–71.

References
 

Ridges of the Ross Dependency
Dufek Coast